Duano is a Malayic language of Indonesia and Malaysia. In Malaysia the language is moribund, being spoken by only a tenth of the ethnic population.

References

Languages of Indonesia
Languages of Malaysia
Endangered Austronesian languages

Malayic languages